Ho Chih-wei (born 14 May 1982), also known by the English name Mark Ho, is a Taiwanese politician.

Early life
Ho Chih-wei was born in the United States in 1982 to Hsueh Ling.

Political career
Ho was elected to the Taipei City Council for the first time in 2010. That year, he was also elected to the Democratic Progressive Party's central standing committee. In July 2012, Ho was reelected to the central standing committee. During the 2012 presidential elections, Ho helped run Tsai Ing-wen's campaign in Taipei. Ho contested a 2014 primary, and secured support from the Democratic Progressive Party for his reelection bid to the city council. In December 2018, the DPP nominated Ho to run in a legislative by-election scheduled as a result of Pasuya Yao's resignation. He faced four other candidates, including Kuomintang nominee Chen Ping-fu, and three independents. Ho was elected to the Legislative Yuan on 27 January 2019, with 38,591 votes, amid a voter turnout of 30.39 percent.

References

1982 births
Living people
Taipei Members of the Legislative Yuan
Members of the 9th Legislative Yuan
Democratic Progressive Party Members of the Legislative Yuan
Taipei City Councilors
Members of the 10th Legislative Yuan